The Basilone Memorial Bridge is a bridge on the New Jersey Turnpike (I-95) in the U.S. state of New Jersey spanning the Raritan River. The bridge connects Edison on the north with New Brunswick on the south.

The bridge, which opened along with the Turnpike in 1951 is named for John Basilone, a World War II recipient of the Medal of Honor who grew up in nearby Raritan, New Jersey.

Memorials for the bridge can be found at both the northbound Joyce Kilmer Travel Plaza and southbound Thomas Edison Travel Plaza.

See also
List of crossings of the Raritan River

Toll bridges in New Jersey
Bridges over the Raritan River
Bridges in Middlesex County, New Jersey
Bridges completed in 1951
New Jersey Turnpike
Road bridges in New Jersey
Edison, New Jersey
New Brunswick, New Jersey
Interstate 95
Bridges on the Interstate Highway System